The SuperGame is an annual football match at Nya Ullevi in Gothenburg, Sweden. Starting in 2012, it is usually played as a game between two top club teams in July or August. While mostly being an exhibition game it's given major attention, as its played between major clubs. Draws are followed up by penalty shootouts.

SuperGames which involve Manchester City are known as Super Matches.

Games

Winners list

References

External links

2012 establishments in Sweden
August sporting events
Football in Gothenburg
July sporting events
Recurring sporting events established in 2012
International sports competitions in Gothenburg
International association football competitions hosted by Sweden